Thungathurthi Assembly constituency is a SC (Scheduled Caste) reserved constituency of the Telangana Legislative Assembly, India. It is one of 4 constituencies in the Suryapet district. It is 42 km far away from the district headquarters Suryapet.

Gadari Kishore of Telangana Rashtra Samithi is representing the constituency for the first time.

Mandals
The Assembly Constituency presently comprises the following Mandals:

Members of Legislative Assembly

Election results

Telangana Legislative Assembly election, 2018

Telangana Legislative Assembly election, 2014

See also
 Thungathurthi
 List of constituencies of Telangana Legislative Assembly

References

Assembly constituencies of Telangana
Assembly constituencies of Nalgonda district